Sun Fanghui (born 1993), is a Chinese chess player who holds the title of Woman International Master.

In 2017, Sun Fanghui was fourth in Women's World Chess Championship Asian Zone 3.5 tournament after Zhai Mo, Ni Shiqun and Zhu Jiner, and qualified for the Women's World Chess Championship 2018. 
In 2017, she was awarded the FIDE Woman International Master (WIM) title.

References

External links

1993 births
Living people
Chinese female chess players
Chess Woman International Masters